was a town located in Namegata District, Ibaraki Prefecture, Japan. It is now a part of the city of Namegata.

As of 2003, the town had an estimated population of 16,221 and a density of 268.65 persons per km². The total area was 60.38 km².

On September 2, 2005, Asō, along with the towns of Kitaura and Tamatsukuri (all from Namegata District), were merged to create the city of Namegata and it ceases as an independent municipality.

External links
Namegata official website 

Dissolved municipalities of Ibaraki Prefecture
Populated places established in 1955
Populated places disestablished in 2005
2005 disestablishments in Japan
1955 establishments in Japan